Jerez is a town and municipality in the Mexican state of Zacatecas. To distinguish the two, the town is officially called Jerez de García Salinas to honor a 19th-century reformer. The town of Jerez is the local government of 128 other communities, a rural area noted for its production of fruit trees and dairy. The town was named a Pueblo Mágico to attract tourism, as it lies close to the state capital of Zacatecas and offers handcrafts, traditional food and architecture.

The Town

The town of Jerez is fifty seven km from the state capital of Zacatecas, located in a deep valley surrounded by forests and fruit orchards. The architecture and layout are distinct from the state capital. The town is centered on a main square called Jardín Rafel Páez, which was the site of the old traditional market. It is surrounded by a wrought iron fence and in the center there is a Moorish style kiosk made of metal with a sandstone base. It is a popular place on Sundays for men playing dominoes and for bands playing a local music called tamborazo, a type of band music with a distinctive rhythm. On the south side of the square is the Portal Humboldt, which has two different types of arches, one in Romance style and the other in Arabic. To the north is the Portal Inguanzo, which dates from 1797. It is the exterior of what was a private home. Today the building houses a café-ice cream shop.

The Palacio Municipal (Municipal Palace) or town government building is in a former two-story mansion which was built between 1730 and 1745. The building has a Baroque facade done in sandstone. It was remodeled in the last decades of the 20th century but its original facade was meticulously preserved. Inside, there is a central courtyard surrounded by arches with two stairwells to connect the floors. The main one is on the east side and the south one has a portrait of Francisco García Salinas.

The Sanctuary of Nuestra Señora de la Soledad (Our Lady of Solitude) dates from 1805, built over what was a hospital for the indigenous. It is said that its designer was inspired by the cathedral in Santiago de Compostela. The style is Neoclassic although it has various Baroque elements such as the main atrium gate. The interior is dominated by the main altar which houses the image of the Virgin Mary after the death of Jesus. There are also finely sculpted confession booths and pulpit. This Virgin is a local icon, who was named a “General” by troops during the Mexican Revolution and is celebrated each year from January to February.

The Edificio de la Torre (Torre Building) was construction on the site Pantaleón de la Torre donated to promote education and culture in the municipality in 1894 as a school for girls. The architectural style is a mix of Romance and Moorish built by stonemason Dámaso Muñetón, who also did the north tower of the Zacatecas Cathedral. Today the building houses the Jerez Cultural Center and the municipal library. An alley dedicated to local handcrafts is located alongside the Edificio de la Torre. These include boots, wide cowboy hats and embroidered leather belts (piteado).

Behind the Sanctuary of Nuestra Señora de la Soledad is the Jardín Hidalgo, which is in front of the Hinojosa Theater. The Theater is in Moorish style with arches, windows and railings in groups of three and five, built between 1876 and 1890, promoted by local politician José María Hinojosa. Its stage is under a sandstone arch and its seats are carved from wood. For most of its history, the lighting was provided by carbide lamps, and a large mirror in the back remains from that time. It is said that the building served as a barracks during the Mexican Revolution. Today it is used for live performances but in the past it was a movie theatre, a hall for social events, a library and a public school.  On the side of the building, there is a Community Museum with items such as carpentry tools, archeological pieces, sewing machines and more from the area's past.

The Ramón López Velarde House Museum is located on the street which is named after the most famous poet from the town. The house was the childhood home of López Velarde has its original furnishings from the 19th century, along with the poet's personal items such as family photographs, copies of manuscripts of works such as Suave Patria, a work completed in 1921 to commemorate the 100th anniversary of the end of the Mexican War of Independence. The building was converted into a museum in 1951, and in 2009 the space was renovated and recordings of Lopez Velarde's verses were added to the original furnishings and many of the poet's personal effects.

The Inmaculada Concepción parish is made of white sandstone. It was built in the 18th century with a simple single bell tower and a Baroque facade.  The arch of the main entrance is crowned by a papal crown and the keys of Saint Peter. Alongside, images of the Four Evangelists appear. The interior is Neoclassic with gold leaf accents on the altars and columns.

Away from the center of the town are a number of other landmarks.  The Casa de Campesino is a construction from the 18th century which was the home of various organizations for rural farmers. Today it is a multiuse building. The Chapel of Nuestra Señora de los Dolores (Our Lady of Sorrow) was built at the beginning of the 19th century. The Portal de las Palomas is home to several traditional bars, fronted by a square called Plaza Tacuba. The Tizoc Bar is also a store that sells antiques and handcrafts. The current town market is a building with arches on two sides. The market offers fruits and vegetables along with handcrafts and prepared food.

Much of town life is still traditional, with businesses closing all or part of Saturday. Charrería and bullfighting are important to the heritage of the area. A major tradition for the town is the Burning of Judas on Holy Saturday, which signals the start of the Feria de Primavera (spring festival). On this day there is charrería, cockfighting and a running of the bulls. The day is organized by the bar owners of the town and draws about 70,000 visitors. The Feria de Primavera is a secular fair, the oldest and most traditional of its type in the state. It dates back to 1824 when local authorities wanted to promote the area's products from produce to yarn, minerals and plaster. During Carnival, there is a tradition called La Jerezaditas, when children run among very young (one to two years old) bulls.

The Municipality

The town of Jerez is the local government for 128 other communities, which together cover an area of 1,521 km2. The municipality, simply called Jerez, borders the municipalities of Fresnillo, Calera de Víctor Rosales, Susticacán, Zacatecas, Villanueva and Valparaíso. The largest community is the municipal seat, which contains half of the municipality's population. Other important communities include Ermita de Guadalupe, Ermita de Los Correa, El Cargadero and Santa Rita These are rural, agricultural towns. El Cargadero is notable for its US expat population.

The Hacienda de Ciénega belonged to the Gordoa family, one of the most influential in Zacatecas in the 19th century. It can only be seen from the outside. The main house and chapel are built with thick walls and large, heavy wooden doors. The chapel is dedicated to Our Lady of Sorrows. The complex surrounds a large plaza with trees.

Estates, Haciendas, and Ranches

History

The area was named by the town's founders, Pedro Carrillo Dávila, Pedro Caldera and Martín Morelos, who were originally from Jerez de la Frontera, Spain. The Zacatecas town is named after the Spanish one. “Jerez” comes from the Arabic “scherich” referring to an abundance of produce. The fertility of the Zacatecas area contributed to the choosing of this name as well as the founders’ hometown. The appendage of the town's name was added in 1952 and honors Francisco García Salinas, a local politician who worked to redistribute land, establish textile mills and open schools. The municipality also has an official seal, which features an image of Our Lady of Solitude.

Before the arrival of the Spanish, two indigenous groups dominated the areas, the Guachichils and the Zacatecos. The Zacatecos spoke a language similar to Nahuatl, and were agricultural. In the 16th century, Jerez lay on the road that Cristobal de Oñate took while he was looking for gold. He found it southwest of the city of Zacatecas. The land of this area was granted to Captain Pedro Carrillo Dávila for his role in the Conquest. He was married to the daughter of conquistador, Bernardino Vázquez De Tapia, Sancha De Belmar. He was followed by missionaries, which worked to convert the indigenous of the area until the end of the 16th century. The original churches of the town were dedicated to Ildefonsus and Saint Dominic . Oral history states the town was founded in 1536 to defend the road between Guadalajara and Zacatecas from indigenous attacks, but written records officially place the founding in 1570.

During the Mexican War of Independence, forces loyal to the Spanish Crown took over the town in 1811 and commenced executing those suspected of aiding the insurgents. This was a decisive factor in the town's later support for the independence movement.

According to the Commercial Directory of 1898, during the same period, the current mining companies of Jerez were Compania Minera La Soledad, Compania Minera Palmira, and Compania Minera San Luis. During this time period, Jerez consisted of two printing establishments, a brewing location, two carriage manufacturers, a single hotel owned by Antonio Castellanos, two silversmiths, three flour mills, and many more businesses.

During the 19th century, the town and area grew and prospered from its agriculture. The first stage of the sanctuary of Our Lady of Solitude was finished in 1819. The state's Instituto Literario was founded here but was moved to the city of Zacatecas in 1837. The Hinojosa Theater was built in 1869. In the late 19th and early 20th centuries, the area had a population of about 12,000 inhabitants. The haciendas around Jerez were some of the most productive in the region, although no railroads were built through here to take goods to market, instead they were sent to city of Zacatecas. Also around this time two of the town's noted artists were born, Ramón López Velarde in 1888 and Máximo Pérez Torres in 1899.
Just before the outbreak of the Mexican Revolution, there was an incident here on September 15, 1910. On this date is the traditional Grito de Dolores to commemorate the start of the War of Independence, but instead of shouting “Viva México” the townspeople shouted “Viva Madero,” the politician opposed to ruling Porfirio Díaz. This caused political instability in the following days. Rebels against Díaz in the area were advised of the situation and came on September 19, ambushing and killing federal troops and burned the Hinojosa Theater, along with the municipal building. This fire destroyed many of the historical records of the municipality. These events forced many inhabitants to flee to other places as the situation deteriorated. The city was officially taken over by troops led by Pánfilo Natera in 1913. The town survived the Revolution but its recuperation was slowed by the following Cristero War. One battle of this conflict took place near the community of Santa Fe, with a victory for the Cristeros.

In 1952 the town's name was changed from simply Jerez to Jerez de García Salinas. The municipality remains simply named Jerez.

The Virgen de la Soledad image was refurbished in 1979.

The new municipal palace was inaugurated in 1983 by then Mexican president Miguel de la Madrid .

In 2001, the municipality had its first non- Partido Revolucionario Institucional president since the Mexican Revolution.

Geography and environment
The territory is mostly flat with some small hills. One exception to this is on the northern edge, where the Sierra de Jerez is found. The highest elevation is 2,750 meters above sea level. Twenty km to the west of the municipal seat is the Sierra de Los Cardos, where most of the municipality's natural scenery is found.  It is rugged but it has places for camping, mountain biking, rock climbing, rappelling and other sports. During the rainy season, various streams flow.

The main surface water is the Jerez River which flows from north to south through the municipality. This river and some streams contain five dams which include Encino mocho and Tesorero. The Cargadero and Tesorero dams have sportsfishing. There are also 158 wells used for drinking water as well as agricultural use.

The climate is temperate and dry with an annual rainfall of 500mm mostly in the summer. The average annual temperature is 16C.

Wild vegetation in the municipality includes holm oak, pine trees, mesquite, huizache, nopal cactus and various types of grasses. Wildlife mostly consists of mammals such as rabbits, pumas, jabali, wildcats, coyotes, deer and raccoons along with various types of birds and reptiles.

Socioeconomics
The municipality's economy is mostly based on agriculture, with crops such as corn, beans and animal feed. The area is particularly noted for its fruit orchards producing peaches, apples and apricots, which about half of the production concentrated around the town of El Cargadero. In addition there is a significant dairy industry producing products such as cheese.

Another traditional economic activity is the creation of handcrafts such as leather products such as saddles, boots and especially belts which have been embroidered with maguey fiber (piteado),  gold and silver jewelry, especially gold filigree half-moon earrings, along with ironworking, stone masonry and pottery.

Although near the capital, it is still unknown to most of the state's tourist traffic.  To encourage tourism, the town of Jerez has become part of the federal government's Pueblos Mágicos program, touting its traditional architecture, traditions and food such as mole jerezano (a type of mole with almonds), carne de puerco en salsa verde, carne adobada, carne deshebrada (shredded beef), asado de boda, brocheta jerezana (beef tips with sausage, bacon, onion, tomatoes and poblano chili peppers), burritos and fruit ices. There is also a water park named Las Margaritas and the El Manantial Eco Tourism Center, with camping, hiking, rappelling and furbished cabins.

Government

Municipal presidents

See also 
Mexico Genealogy

References

External links

Cultural website
Historical website

Populated places in Zacatecas
Populated places established in 1563
Pueblos Mágicos
1563 establishments in New Spain